Olaf Bergenn (1 August 1853 – 1896) was a Norwegian trade unionist.

He was born in Saude. He worked as a typesetter in Kristiania from 1883. From 1886 he chaired the Norwegian Central Union of Book Printers, Norway's first lasting trade union. He was also its manager from 1888 to 1892, and edited the magazine for Nordic typographers, Nordisk Trykkeritidende, until his death in 1896.

References

1853 births
1896 deaths
People from Sauherad
Trade unionists from Oslo
Typesetters